Luca Pancalli (born 16 April 1964) is an Italian sports manager and former swimmer. He is currently the Commissioner of the Italian Football Federation.

Biography
After having won a national youth modern pentathlon championship, Pancalli became a quadriplegic in 1981 following a tumble from a horse during an international race in Austria. Despite this, he was still able to partially move his arms and took part in four different editions of the Paralympic Games from 1984 to 1996, winning eight gold, six silver, and one bronze medal in swimming.

He was appointed president of the Italian Paralympic Committee in 2000. He was then appointed vice-president of the Italian National Olympic Committee, being the first disabled person to take the job.

On September 21, 2006, after Guido Rossi resigned, Pancalli was appointed Extraordinary Commissioner of the FIGC (Italian Football Federation). On February 2, 2007, following gratuitous violences in the Sicilian derby in Catania which led to the killing of a policeman, Pancalli announced his intention to indefinitely suspend all football activities in the country. This is the second time such an event happened, the first time being after Genoa C.F.C. supporter Vincenzo Spagnolo was stabbed by an alleged AC Milan ultras member called Simone Brasaglia in 1995.

See also
Italy at the Paralympics - Multiple medallists

References

External links
 

1964 births
Living people
People with tetraplegia
Italian sports directors
Paralympic swimmers of Italy
Swimmers at the 1984 Summer Paralympics
Swimmers at the 1988 Summer Paralympics
Swimmers at the 1992 Summer Paralympics
Swimmers at the 1996 Summer Paralympics
Paralympic gold medalists for Italy
Paralympic silver medalists for Italy
Paralympic bronze medalists for Italy
Medalists at the 1984 Summer Paralympics
Medalists at the 1988 Summer Paralympics
Medalists at the 1996 Summer Paralympics
Italian football chairmen and investors
International Paralympic Committee members
Paralympic medalists in swimming
Italian male freestyle swimmers
Italian male backstroke swimmers
Italian male breaststroke swimmers
Italian male butterfly swimmers
Italian male medley swimmers
S4-classified Paralympic swimmers
Medalists at the World Para Swimming Championships
20th-century Italian people
21st-century Italian people